Karl Nikolaevich Kahl (Russian: Карл Николаевич Каль; 1873, Riga - 20 January 1938, Tomsk) was a Baltic-German landscape painter, associated with the Düsseldorfer Malerschule. He fell victim to the Great Purge of the late 1930s.

Life and work 
From 1891 to 1893, he studied in  Vitebsk, then enrolled at the Kunstakademie Düsseldorf. There, his primary instructors were Heinrich Lauenstein,Hugo Crola and Adolf Schill Later, he studied with Arthur Kampf and Johann Peter Theodor Janssen. 

After graduating, he spent time in Munich and Karlsruhe. He also visitec Belgium, Holland, and Paris, then returned to Düsseldorf. He stayed there only a short time before going back to Vitebsk in 1898. He exhibited eighteen paintings at the Louisiana Purchase Exposition in St. Louis in 1904. After 1911, he lived and worked in Vladivostok, painting and teaching at a private school.

On 28 April 1935, he was arrested and, in October, sentenced to five years in a labor camp. He was taken to camp #2 in Tomsk, where he was able to work as a painter. There, in December of 1937, he was arrested again and charged with spying for Germany. He was sentenced to death the following month. Two weeks later, he was executed by firing squad. In 1965, he was rehabilitated by the Supreme Court of the Soviet Union.

References

Further reading 
 Julius Döring, Wilhelm Neumann (Eds.): "Kahl, Karl", Lexikon Baltischer Künstler, Jonck & Poliewsky, 1908, pg.78 (Online)
 "Kahl, Karl". In: Hans Vollmer (Ed.): Allgemeines Lexikon der Bildenden Künstler von der Antike bis zur Gegenwart, Vol.19: Ingouville–Kauffungen. E. A. Seemann, Leipzig 1926, pg.434

External links 

 Kahl, K.N., References and bibliography @ Прошлый Век

1873 births
1938 deaths
Painters from the Russian Empire

Baltic German people from the Russian Empire
Kunstakademie Düsseldorf alumni
Great Purge victims
Gulag detainees
Artists from Riga